Melipilla Province is one of six provinces in the Santiago Metropolitan Region of central Chile. The provincial capital is the city of Melipilla.

Administration
As a province, Melipilla is a second-level administrative division of Chile, governed by a provincial delegate who is appointed by the president. The current delegate is Sandra Saavedra, who was appointed by president Gabriel Boric.

Communes
The province comprises five communes (Spanish: comunas), each governed by a municipality consisting of an alcalde and municipal council:
Curacaví
María Pinto
Melipilla
San Pedro
Alhué

Geography and demography
According to the 2002 census, Melipilla was the fifth most populous province in the region with a total population of 141,165. At that time, there were 80,790 people living in urban areas, 60,375 living in rural areas, 71,595 men, and 69,570 women.

References

External links
 

Provinces of Chile
Provinces of Santiago Metropolitan Region